Mangrol is one of the 182 Legislative Assembly constituencies of Gujarat state in India. It is part of Junagadh district.

List of segments 
This assembly seat represents the following segments,

 Malia-Hatina Taluka
 Mangrol Taluka (Part) Villages – Arena, Dhelana, Husenabad, Jamvali, Juthal, Khodada, Kotda Juna, Kotda Nava, Lambora, Lathodra, Maktupur, Mangrol (M), Mankhetra, Sakrana, Shaikhpur, Shapur, Shepa, Sheriyakhan, Sheriyaj, Virpur, Kankasa

Members of Legislative Assembly 

^ : bypoll

Election results

2022

2017

2014

See also 
 List of constituencies of Gujarat Legislative Assembly
 Gujarat Legislative Assembly

References

External links
 

Assembly constituencies of Gujarat
Junagadh district